The 16th National Congress of the Kuomintang was the sixteenth national congress of the Kuomintang, held on 29–30 July 2001 in Taipei, Taiwan.

See also
 Kuomintang

References

2001 conferences
2001 in Taiwan
National Congresses of the Kuomintang
Politics of Taiwan